The 2010 Torneio Internacional Cidade de São Paulo (also known as the 2010 International Tournament of São Paulo) was the second edition of the Torneio Internacional Cidade de São Paulo de Futebol Feminino, an invitational women's football tournament held annually in Brazil. It began on 9 December and ended on 19 December 2010.

Format
The four invited teams were in. In the first phase, the teams played each other within the group in a single round. The two teams with the most points earned in the respective group, were qualified for the next phase.

In the final stage, the first and second teams placed in Group. Played only one match, becoming the champion, the winner team. If the match ends in a tie, will be considered champion, the team with the best campaign in the first phase.

The third and fourth teams placed in the group. Played in one game, becoming the third-placed, the winner team. If the match ends in a tie, will be considered champion, the team with the best campaign in the first phase.

Teams
Listed are the confirmed teams.

Group stage
All times are local

Group A

Knockout stage

Third place match

Final

Final results

Goalscorers

6 goals
 Marta

4 goals
 Christine Sinclair

3 goals
 Kirsten van de Ven

2 goals

 Diana Matheson
 Josée Bélanger
 Sylvia Smit
 Claudia van den Heiligenberg
 Guadalupe Worbis

1 goal

 Gabriela
 Cristiane
 Chantal de Ridder

References

External links
Official Site (in Portuguese)
All Matches Brazilian National Team (in Portuguese)

2009
2010 in women's association football
2010 in Brazilian women's football
2010–11 in Dutch women's football
2010–11 in Mexican football
2010 in Canadian women's soccer